United Nations Security Council Resolution 2068 was adopted on 19 September 2012. It declared the readiness of the United Nations Security Council to impose sanctions on armed groups persistently violating the human rights of children including child abuse and child soldier.

Four of the fifteen members of the Security Council, Azerbaijan, China, Pakistan, and Russia, abstained from voting, expressing their governments' reservations on the text adopted, while the other eleven members voted in favour of the resolution.

See also 
List of United Nations Security Council Resolutions 2001 to 2100
Military use of children
Working Group on Children and Armed Conflict

References

External links
Text of the resolution at undocs.org

2012 United Nations Security Council resolutions
United Nations Security Council resolutions concerning children and armed conflict
September 2012 events